Dharamyudh may refer to:

 Dharamyudh (Sikhism), a term in Sikhism to describe a just war
 Dharamyudh (film), a 1988 Indian Bollywood film in Hindi

See also 
 Dharma-yuddha, a related just war concept in Hinduism
 Dharam Yudh Morcha, Sikh devolutionary protest movement during the early 1980s
 Dharam Yudh Morcha (film), a 2016 Indian film in Punjabi about the 1980s Sikh movement
 Dharmayudham, a 1973 Indian film in Malayalam
 Dharma Yuddham, a 1979 Indian film in Tamil
 Dharmayutham, a 2012–13 Indian soap opera in Tamil
 Dharmayuddhaya, a 2017 Sri Lankan film in Sinhala